Deepak Punia (born 27 September 1993) is an Indian first-class cricketer who plays for Delhi. He has also played for Haryana, Saurashtra and Services. In 2016, he was bought by the Mumbai Indians for the 2016 Indian Premier League.

In October 2017, an arrest warrant was issued for Punia by the Indian Navy, after he was reported to be playing for Haryana in the 2017–18 Ranji Trophy without having permission from the Navy to do so.

References

External links
 

1993 births
Living people
Indian cricketers
Haryana cricketers
Mumbai Indians cricketers
Saurashtra cricketers
Services cricketers
People from Bhiwani
Cricketers from Haryana